Wendy Powell is an American voice actress and agent, best known for her work in anime dubs for Funimation. Some of her notable roles include Envy from Fullmetal Alchemist, Miss Merry Christmas from One Piece, and Mukuro from YuYu Hakusho. She was married on March 19, 2011.

Filmography

Anime series

Film

Video games

References

External links

American video game actresses
American voice actresses
Living people
21st-century American actresses
Year of birth missing (living people)